The Pegas Bain is a Czech single-place paraglider that was designed and produced by Pegas 2000 of Prague. Introduced in 2002, it is now out of production.

Design and development
The aircraft was designed as an intermediate glider. The models are each named for their approximate wing area in square metres.

Variants
Bain 26
Mid-sized model for medium-weight pilots. The glider model is Swiss SHV Performance certified.
Bain 28
Large-sized model for heavier pilots. The glider model is Swiss SHV Performance certified.

Specifications (Bain 26)

References

Bain
Paragliders